Elections to Daventry District Council were held on 7 May 1998.  One third of the council was up for election and the council stayed under no overall control.

After the election, the composition of the council was
Conservative 17
Labour 13
Liberal Democrat 3
Independent 2

Election result

References
"Council poll results", The Guardian 9 May 1998 page 16

1998 English local elections
1998
1990s in Northamptonshire